Yonit Levi (born 12 July 1977) is an Israeli news anchor, television presenter and journalist.

Biography
Yonit Levi was born in the French Hill 

Jerusalem, to an Ashkenazi Jewish family. Her father, Yoram, was born in the USSR, and her mother, Neomi, was born in Romania. She lived with her parents in Chicago for a few years, where she attended Bernard Zell Anshe Emet Day School.

In October 2011, she married Ido Rosenblum, an Israeli screenwriter, director and actor. The wedding was in Tel Aviv. Their first child was born in November 2013 at Meir Hospital in Kfar Saba. Their second child was born in December 2015. In 2018, they had another child.

Media career
Levi is the chief news anchor of the flagship bulletin on Keshet 12. After finishing her army service as foreign news editor for the Army Radio (Galei Tzahal, IDF Radio), Levi joined Israel Television News Company in 1998. In 2002, the former anchors Ya'akov Eilon and Miki Haimovich moved to Channel 10, and at age 25, Levi was chosen as the anchor of Channel 2's prime time news program. A few years later, when her co-anchor resigned, she became the first woman in Israel to be appointed the sole anchor position of a prime-time newscast on a commercial channel. She has also served as the channel's field reporter for such international stories as the Japan tsunami disaster, the U.S. elections and wars in Gaza. Under Levi, the prime time news on Channel 2 remained the most watched Israeli daily program.

In January 2008, Levi conducted an interview with U.S. President George W. Bush at the White House.  In July 2010, Levi interviewed U.S. President Barack Obama at the White House.

In 2015, Levi gave a rare interview to American journalist Charlie Rose of PBS, expressing personal opinions on Israeli current events.

In 2022, Levi conducted an interview with U.S. President Joe Biden at the White House.

See also
Israel Television News Company
Women in journalism and media professions
Women in Israel
Journalism in Israel

References

External links 

1977 births
Living people
Israeli television personalities
Israeli television presenters
Israeli women journalists
Israeli Ashkenazi Jews
People from Jerusalem
Israeli people of Romanian-Jewish descent
Israeli television news anchors
Israeli women television presenters